Wynton Marsalis is the debut album by the jazz trumpeter Wynton Marsalis. It was released in 1982 by Columbia. It contains seven tracks, three composed by Marsalis. The album peaked at number 165 on the Billboard 200 and number nine on the Billboard Jazz Albums chart.

Track listing

Personnel
 Wynton Marsalis – trumpet
 Branford Marsalis – tenor and soprano saxophones (tracks 1-5, 7)
 Herbie Hancock – piano (tracks 3, 5, 6)
 Kenny Kirkland – piano (tracks 1, 2, 7)
 Ron Carter – double bass (tracks 3-6)
 Charles Fambrough – double bass (track 7)
 Clarence Seay – double bass (tracks 1-2)
 Tony Williams – drums (tracks 3-6) 
 Jeff "Tain" Watts – drums (tracks 1-2, 7)

See also
 Wynton Marsalis discography

References

1982 debut albums
Columbia Records albums
Wynton Marsalis albums